Siraj Mohammad Khan (born 2 December 1947) is a Pakistani politician who had been a member of the National Assembly of Pakistan, from June 2013 to May 2018.

Early life
He was born on 2 November 1947 in Misri Banda, District Nowshera, Pakistan .

Political career
Khan was elected to the National Assembly of Pakistan as a candidate of Pakistan Tehreek-e-Insaf (PTI) from Constituency NA-6 (Nowshera-II) in 2013 Pakistani general election. He received 54,266 votes and defeated a candidate of Pakistan Muslim League (N).

In August 2014, in order to escalate pressure on Prime Minister Nawaz Sharif to resign, PTI decided to withdraw their members from the National Assembly. However, Khan defected from party and in a letter to the Speaker of the National Assembly of Pakistan narrated, "I did not gave my resignation voluntarily, therefore, it should not be accepted".

In February 2021, he joined the Awami National Party.

References

Living people
Pakistan Tehreek-e-Insaf politicians
Pashtun people
People from Nowshera District
Pakistani MNAs 2013–2018
1947 births